General elections were held in Papua and New Guinea on 31 August 1957.

Electoral system
The 29-member Legislative Council consisted of the Administrator, 16 civil servants, nine members appointed by the Administrator (three representatives of the indigenous population, three representing European settlers and three representing missionaries) and three elected Europeans. The Chinese community were also given the right to vote alongside Europeans.

The three elected members were elected from three single-member constituencies, New Guinea Islands, New Guinea Mainland and Papua by preferential voting. Voting was not compulsory.

Automatic postal voting was introduced for all registered voters who lived over ten miles from the nearest polling station.

Campaign
In New Guinea Islands, incumbent MLC Don Barrett was opposed by Dudley Jones, a Rabaul lawyer.

George Whittaker did not stand for re-election in New Guinea Mainland after retiring. The seat was contested by Ian Downs, a former District Commissioner, and Sydney Barker, a dentist and miner from Wau.

The Papua seat was contested by the incumbent Ernest James and Craig Kirke, a solicitor based in Port Moresby.

Results
Dudley Jones unexpectedly defeated Don Barrett in New Guinea Islands, whilst Ian Downs was elected in New Guinea Mainland and Ernest James was re-elected in Papua. Over 3,000 people voted, a significant increase on the 734 votes cast in the 1954 elections (although one seat had been uncontested).

Appointed members
Doris Booth declined to be re-nominated as a European member, with John Hohnen nominated in her place, whilst Merari Dickson was replaced by Mahuru Rarua-Rarua as a native representative.

References

Elections in Papua New Guinea
Papua
1957 in Papua New Guinea
Politics of Papua and New Guinea
Election and referendum articles with incomplete results
August 1957 events in Oceania